Simone Smith (born 8 April 1993) is an Australian rugby league footballer who plays for the New Zealand Warriors in the NRL Women's Premiership. 

Background
Born in Kempsey, New South Wales and raised in Port Macquarie, Smith is of Indigenous Australian descent.

Playing career
In 2016, while playing for the Port City Breakers, Smith represented the Indigenous All Stars. In February 2017, she again represented the Indigenous All Stars.

A knee injury later in the year, which later her forced her to undergo a reconstruction, saw her miss the 2017 Women's Rugby League World Cup.

In May 2019, Smith represented NSW Country at the Women's National Championships. On 26 June 2019, she signed with the Sydney Roosters NRL Women's Premiership team.

On 10 August 2019, she came off the bench and scored a try in CRL Newcastle's NSWRL Women's Premiership Grand Final win over Mounties RLFC. In Round 2 of the 2019 NRL Women's season, Smith made her debut for the Roosters in their 0–20 loss to the Brisbane Broncos.

On 18 September 2020, Smith joined the New Zealand Warriors NRLW team. In Round 1 of the 2020 NRL Women's season, she made her debut for the Warriors, scoring a try in a 14–28 loss to the Brisbane Broncos.

References

External links
New Zealand Warriors profile

1993 births
Living people
Indigenous Australian rugby league players
Australian female rugby league players
Australia women's national rugby league team players
Rugby league five-eighths
Rugby league halfbacks
Sydney Roosters (NRLW) players
New Zealand Warriors (NRLW) players